Kwang-min, also spelled Gwang-min, is a Korean masculine given name. The meaning differs based on the hanja used to write each syllable of the name. There are 13 hanja with the reading "kwang" and 27 hanja with the reading "min" on the South Korean government's official list of hanja which may be used in given names.

People with this name include:

Footballers
Kim Kwang-min (footballer, born 1962), North Korean defender and later women's national team coach
Jung Kwang-min (born 1976), South Korean midfielder (FC Seoul)
Park Gwang-min (born 1982), South Korean midfielder (Seongnam Ilhwa Chunma, Gwangju Sangmu)
Kim Kwang-min (footballer, born 1985), South Korean defender (Iraqi Premier League)
Ko Kwang-min (born 1988), South Korean midfielder (FC Seoul)
Ju Kwang-min (born 1990), North Korean goalkeeper

Others
Go Gwang-min (born 1981), South Korean female field hockey player
Kim Gwong-min (born 1988), South Korean rugby sevens player
Jo Kwang-min (born 1995), South Korean singer, member of Boyfriend

See also
List of Korean given names

References

Korean masculine given names